In mathematics, a Lipschitz domain (or domain with Lipschitz boundary) is a domain in Euclidean space whose boundary is "sufficiently regular" in the sense that it can be thought of as locally being the graph of a Lipschitz continuous function. The term is named after the German mathematician Rudolf Lipschitz.

Definition

Let . Then  is called a Lipschitz domain if for every point  there exists a hyperplane  of dimension  through , a Lipschitz-continuous function  over that hyperplane, and reals  and  such that
 
 
where 
 is a unit vector that is normal to 
 is the open ball of radius ,

In other words, at each point of its boundary,  is locally the set of points located above the graph of some Lipschitz function.

Generalization 

A more general notion is that of weakly Lipschitz domains, which are domains whose boundary is locally flattable by a bilipschitz mapping. Lipschitz domains in the sense above are sometimes called strongly Lipschitz by contrast with weakly Lipschitz domains. 

A domain  is weakly Lipschitz if for every point  there exists a radius  and a map  such that
  is a bijection;
 
 

A (strongly) Lipschitz domain is always a weakly Lipschitz domain but the converse is not true. An example of weakly Lipschitz domains that fails to be a strongly Lipschitz domain is given by the two-bricks domain

Applications of Lipschitz domains

Many of the Sobolev embedding theorems require that the domain of study be a Lipschitz domain. Consequently, many partial differential equations and variational problems are defined on Lipschitz domains.

References

 

Geometry
Lipschitz maps
Sobolev spaces